King of the Dancehall can refer to:

 King of the Dancehall (film), a 2016 American film
 King of the Dancehall (song), a 2004 song by Beenie Man